The  (PhMDA) is an Independent Administrative Institution responsible for ensuring the safety, efficacy and quality of pharmaceuticals and medical devices in Japan. It is similar in function to the Food and Drug Administration in the United States, the Medicines and Healthcare products Regulatory Agency in the United Kingdom or the Food and Drug Administration in the Philippines.

The PhMDA has been eCTD compliant at least since December 2017.

Tasks 
Among other things, the agency is tasked with the following:
 Drug and medical device testing:
 Scientific review of market authorization applications based on Japanese pharmaceutical law
 Advice in clinical trials or in the preparation of dossiers for the registration procedure (New Drug Applications (NDA))
 Inspection and conformity assessment of Good Clinical Practice (GCP), Good Laboratory Practice (GLP), and Good Practice Systems and Programs (GPSP)
 Auditing of manufacturers to ensure they conform to Good Manufacturing Practice (GMP) and have a suitable Quality Management System (QMS)
 Post-marketing drug safety:
 The collection, analysis and distribution of data on the quality, efficacy, and safety data of medicines and medical devices
 Advising consumers on approved products
 Research on the development of industry standards
 Victim compensation:
 Payment of medical costs, lost wages, and pain and suffering for those who experience injury or disability resulting from the use of medical products
 Disbursement of funds to those infected with HIV as a result of blood transfusions

Leadership 
The chief executive of the agency is Yasuhiro Fujiwara, former head of the National Cancer Center Japan. From 2008 to 2018, the chief executive of the agency was Tatsuya Kondo, a neurosurgeon and graduate of the University of Tokyo.

References

External links
 

Medical and health organizations based in Japan
National agencies for drug regulation
Independent Administrative Institutions of Japan
Government agencies established in 2004
2004 establishments in Japan